Sir Peter Derek Fry (26 May 1931 – 12 May 2015) was a British Conservative politician.

Born in High Wycombe, Fry was educated at the Royal Grammar School, High Wycombe, and Worcester College, Oxford. He became an insurance broker and a director of the family retail clothing business. He served as a councillor on Buckinghamshire County Council from 1961.

Fry contested Nottingham North in 1964 and Willesden East in 1966. He was elected a Member of Parliament at the 1969 Wellingborough by-election. He represented the seat until 1997, when he lost to Labour's Paul Stinchcombe by a margin of 187 votes. He subsequently became the Chairman of the Bingo Association, Chairman of the Federation of European Bingo Associations, and a trustee of the Responsibility in Gambling Trust.

During his time as an MP, Fry was a Eurosceptic, who repeatedly voted against the government in 1992-1993 over its attempts to enshrine the Maastricht Treaty into UK law.

Fry was interviewed in 2012 as part of The History of Parliament's oral history project.

Fry died on 12 May 2015, aged 83.

References

Sources
Times Guide to the House of Commons, Times Newspapers Limited, 1997

External links
 
 Peter Fry interview at History of Parliament Online

1931 births
2015 deaths
Conservative Party (UK) MPs for English constituencies
Alumni of Worcester College, Oxford
Knights Bachelor
People educated at the Royal Grammar School, High Wycombe
UK MPs 1966–1970
UK MPs 1970–1974
UK MPs 1974
UK MPs 1974–1979
UK MPs 1979–1983
UK MPs 1983–1987
UK MPs 1987–1992
UK MPs 1992–1997
Councillors in Buckinghamshire
Place of death missing
Politicians awarded knighthoods
British Eurosceptics